Samuel West Peel (September 13, 1831 – December 18, 1924) was an American lawyer, politician, and jurist who served as a member of the United States House of Representatives from 1883 to 1893.

Early life and education 
Peel was born near Batesville, Arkansas to John Wilson and Elizabeth West Peel. At age four, his mother died and he went to live with his grandparents. Peel attended the local public schools. As a teenager ,he worked as a store clerk at his father's store. He also worked as a deputy court clerk for his father.

Career 
He served as clerk of the circuit court of Carroll County, Arkansas from 1858 to 1860.

Confederate Army 
After Arkansas seceded from the Union, he entered the Confederate service in 1861 as a private. Peel was elected major of the 3rd Arkansas Infantry Regiment, and later as a colonel of the 4th Arkansas Infantry Regiment. Peel fought at the Battle of Wilson's Creek and Battle of Prairie Grove. At the end of the war, he mustered out as a lieutenant colonel.

Law practice 
After leaving the Army, he returned home to Carrollton and found his house burned down. He studied law under his brother-in-law, Judge James Middleton Pittman. In 1865, he was admitted to the bar and commenced the practice of his profession in Carrollton, Arkansas. He moved to Bentonville, Benton County, in 1867 and continued practicing of law.

Politics 
He was appointed by the governor of Arkansas as the prosecuting attorney of the fourth judicial circuit of Arkansas in 1873. He held that position until 1876.

Peel was elected as a Democrat to the United States House of Representatives for the Forty-eighth and to the four succeeding Congresses (March 4, 1883 – March 3, 1893). He served as chairman of the Committee on Indian Affairs (Fiftieth and Fifty-second Congresses). Tribal councils frequently met on the front lawn of his mansion. He was an unsuccessful candidate for renomination in 1892. He resumed his law practice in Bentonville, Arkansas, and before the United States Court of Claims at Washington, D.C., until 1915.

Personal life 
Peel married Mary Emaline Berry on January 30, 1853 and had nine children. He died in Bentonville, Arkansas on December 18, 1924 at age 93. He was interred in the Bentonville cemetery. The city Peel, Oregon was named for him.

References

External links 
 Samuel West Peel (1831–1924) in the Encyclopedia of Arkansas History & Culture
 
 Samuel W. Peel at Biographical Directory of the United States Congress
 

1831 births
1924 deaths
Democratic Party members of the United States House of Representatives from Arkansas
Confederate States Army officers